An inuksuk (plural inuksuit) or inukshuk (from the , plural ; alternatively  in Inuinnaqtun,  in Iñupiaq,  in Greenlandic) is a type of stone landmark or cairn built by, and for the use of, Inuit, Iñupiat, Kalaallit, Yupik, and other peoples of the Arctic region of North America. These structures are found in northern Canada, Greenland, and Alaska (United States). This combined region, north of the Arctic Circle, is dominated by the tundra biome and has areas with few natural landmarks.

The inuksuk may historically have been used for navigation, as a point of reference, a marker for travel routes, fishing places, camps, hunting grounds, places of veneration, drift fences used in hunting, or to mark a food cache. The Iñupiat in northern Alaska used inuksuit to assist in the herding of caribou into contained areas for slaughter. Varying in shape and size, the inuksuit have ancient roots in Inuit culture.

Historically, the most common types of inuksuit are built with stone placed upon stone. The simplest type is a single stone positioned in an upright manner. There is some debate as to whether the appearance of human- or cross-shaped cairns developed in the Inuit culture before the arrival of European missionaries and explorers. The size of some inuksuit suggests that the construction was often a communal effort.

At Inuksuk Point (Enukso Point) on Baffin Island, there are more than 100 inuksuit. The site was designated a National Historic Site of Canada in 1969.

Name

The word  means "that which acts in the capacity of a human". It is pronounced  in Nunavik and the southern part of Baffin Island (see Inuit phonology for the linguistic reasons). In many of the central Nunavut dialects, it has the etymologically related name .

However, it is not the most common type of inuksuk. It is distinguished from inuksuit in general.

The Hammer of Thor, located on the Ungava Peninsula, Quebec may be an inuksuk.

Modern usage

Inuksuit continue to serve as an Inuit cultural symbol. An inuksuk is the centrepiece of the flag and coat of arms of the Canadian territory of Nunavut, and the flag of Nunatsiavut. The Inuksuk High School in Iqaluit is named after the landmark.

Inuksuitparticularly, but not exclusively, of the  varietyare also increasingly serving as a mainstream Canadian national symbol. In 1999, Inukshuk was the name for the International Arctic Art & Music Project of ARBOS in the Canadian provinces of Quebec, Ontario, Nunavik, and Nunavut; and in Greenland, Austria, Denmark and Norway.

On July 13, 2005, Canadian military personnel erected an inuksuk on Hans Island, along with a plaque and a Canadian flag, as part of Canada's longstanding dispute with Denmark over the small Arctic island.  The markers have been erected throughout the country, often as generic gateways into tourist regions, including a  inuksuk that stands in Toronto on the shores of Lake Ontario.  Located in Battery Park, it commemorates the World Youth Day 2002 festival that was held in the city in July 2002.

An  is the basis of the logo of the 2010 Winter Olympics designed by Vancouver artist Elena Rivera MacGregor. Its use in this context has been controversial among the Inuit, and the First Nations within British Columbia. Although the design has been questioned, people believe it pays tribute to Alvin Kanak's 1986 inuksuk at English Bay. Friendship and the welcoming of the world are the meanings of both the English Bay structure and the 2010 Winter Olympics emblem.

The Vancouver 2010 logo and the construction of inuksuit around the world have led to increasing recognition of them. There are five authentic inuksuit which were donated to other jurisdictions wholly or in partby the government of Canada: they are located in Brisbane, Australia; Monterrey, Mexico; Oslo, Norway; Washington, D.C., United States; and Guatemala City, Guatemala.

A Canadian-donated inuksuk was built in Monterrey, Mexico, in October 2007 by the Inuvialuit artist Bill Nasogaluak. The sculpture was presented to the people of the northern state of Nuevo León as a gift from the Monterrey chapter of the Canadian Chamber of Commerce in Mexico and the Government of Canada, to mark the chamber's 10th anniversary in the city. The sculpture stands over the Santa Lucía Riverwalk. Nasogaluak, of Tuktoyaktuk, personally chose the rocks for the structure from a local quarry near Monterrey. The inuksuk contains two rocks which the artist took to Mexico from Canada, one from the high Arctic and another from his home town of Toronto. Together they form the inuksuk's heart.

The inuksuk was also used as the symbol of the Summit of the Americas, because of its connotations of "guidance and unity ... towards common goals."

Officials in various wilderness parks throughout Canada routinely dismantle inuksuit constructed by hikers and campers, for fear that they could misdirect park visitors from the cairns and other markers that indicate hiking trails. The practice of erecting inuksuit in parks has become so widespread that Killarney Provincial Park, on the north shore of Ontario's Georgian Bay, issued a notice in 2007 urging visitors to "stop the invasion" of inuksuit.

A large number of inuksuit have been built in some areas along the Trans-Canada Highway, including Northern Ontario. In 2010, a journalist from Sudbury's Northern Life counted 93 inuksuit along Highway 69 between Sudbury and Parry Sound. The journalist successfully tracked down a person who had built two inuksuit along the route; he attributed his action to having had a "fill the dreams moment where I needed to stop and do it" while driving home from a family funeral.

In 2015, a small group of women near Hamilton, Ontario, constructed 1,181 inuksuit on the Chedoke Rail Trail to memorialize the issue of Missing and Murdered Indigenous Women, while seeking government action. It was one of many types of activism across the county, and the newly elected government committed to conducting a national inquiry that year.

According to Guinness World Records, the tallest inuksuk is in Schomberg, Ontario, Canada.

On the occasion of the 20th Anniversary of the Rome Statute, to mark Canada's support for the International Criminal Court (ICC) and as a symbol for its commitment to reconciliation with Canada's First Nations, Canadian Minister of Justice and Attorney General Wilson-Raybould on 7 March 2018 donated an inuksuk as a gift to the ICC. It was unveiled by her and ICC President Judge Silvia Fernández de Gurmendi at the ICC premises in The Hague.

In popular culture
The Canadian rock band Rush featured an inuksuk on the cover of their 1996 album Test for Echo.

Gallery

See also 

 Badlands Guardian
 Cairn
 Dolmen
 Herma
 Monolith
 Missing and murdered Indigenous women
 Petroform
 Rock art
 Serge (religious)
 Totem pole

References

Further reading

External links

 
 
 
 

Stone sculptures
Indigenous sculpture of the Americas
Types of monuments and memorials
Inuit culture
Canadian culture
Outdoor sculptures in Canada
Territorial symbols of Nunavut
Sacred rocks